The Bell of Death is a 1939 mystery detective novel by Anthony Gilbert, the pen name of British writer Lucy Beatrice Malleson. It is the sixth in her long-running series featuring the unscrupulous London lawyer and detective Arthur Crook. It was published during the Golden Age of Detective Fiction. Reviewing it for the Times Literary Supplement, Maurice Percy Ashley commented "as usual with Mr. Gilbert’s stories this is exciting and well written, but it is so complicated that the reader can do little more than hold his breath".

Synopsis
When a vagrant is found dead in the belfry of a London church, suspicion falls on the verger who has completely disappeared. Solicitor Arthur Crook promises his wife to clear his name as soon as he is found.

References

Bibliography
 Cooper, John & Pike, B.A. Artists in Crime: An Illustrated Survey of Crime Fiction First Edition Dustwrappers, 1920-1970. Scolar Press, 1995.
 Magill, Frank Northen . Critical Survey of Mystery and Detective Fiction: Authors, Volume 2. Salem Press, 1988.
Murphy, Bruce F. The Encyclopedia of Murder and Mystery. Springer, 1999.
 Reilly, John M. Twentieth Century Crime & Mystery Writers. Springer, 2015.

1939 British novels
British mystery novels
British thriller novels
Novels by Anthony Gilbert
Novels set in London
British detective novels
Collins Crime Club books